Binibining Pilipinas 2013 (billed as Binibining Pilipinas Gold) was the 50th edition of Binibining Pilipinas. It was held at the Smart Araneta Coliseum in Quezon City, Metro Manila, Philippines on April 14, 2013.

At the end of the event, Janine Tugonon crowned Ariella Arida as Miss Universe Philippines 2013, Nicole Schmitz crowned Bea Santiago as Binibining Pilipinas International 2013, and Katrina Dimaranan crowned Cindy Miranda as Binibining Pilipinas Tourism 2013. A new title, Binibining Pilipinas Supranational 2013, was awarded by Ellaine Kay Moll to Mutya Johanna Datul. Pia Wurtzbach was named the sole Runner-Up.

A pre-pageant primer, called The Golden Road to the Crown on ABS-CBN's Sunday's Best, was aired last April 7, 2013.

Results
Color keys
  The contestant Won in an International pageant.
  The contestant was a Runner-up in an International pageant.
  The contestant was a Semi-Finalist in an International pageant.

Special Awards

Judges 
 James Younghusband – Midfielder for the Philippine national football team
 Boy Abunda – TV personality, publicist, talent manager
 Gen. Alan Purisima – Chief of the Philippine National Police
 Louis Ng – Macanese businessman, Executive Director and COO of SJM Holdings, Ltd.
 Eugenio Lopez, III – Chairman of ABS-CBN Corporation
 Gloria Diaz – Miss Universe 1969
 Liliana Marquez Zawadzky – Colombian interior and jewelry designer
 Hirofumi Hashimoto – Chairman of Miss International
 Bobby Huang – President of San Miguel Brewery, Inc.
 H.E. Roberto Mayorga Lorca – Ambassador Extraordinary and Plenipotentiary of the Embassy of Chile
 H.E. Massimo Roscigno – Ambassador Extraordinary and Plenipotentiary of the Embassy of the Republic of Italy
 Jose Rene Almendras – Secretary to the Cabinet of the Philippines

Contestants
50 contestants competed for the four titles.

Notes

Post-pageant Notes 

 Ariella Arida competed at Miss Universe 2013 in Moscow, Russia and finished as Third Runner-Up. Prior to being called Third Runner-Up, Arida won the online voting which secured her a spot at the Top 16.
 Bea Rose Santiago competed at Miss International 2013 in Tokyo, Japan where she later emerged as the winner. Santiago is the fifth Miss International from the Philippines.
 Cindy Miranda competed at Miss Tourism Queen International 2013 in Xianning, China where she finished as one of the ten finalists. Miranda also bagged the Miss Tourism Ambassador Asia and Best in Attitude awards.
 Mutya Johanna Datul competed at Miss Supranational 2013 in Minsk, Belarus where she was crowned as the winner. Aside from winning the crown, Datul also bagged the Miss Personality award.
 Pia Wurtzbach later competed at Binibining Pilipinas 2014 and finished as one of the fifteen semifinalists. Wurtzbach competed again at Binibining Pilipinas 2015 and was crowned Binibining Pilipinas 2015. She competed at Miss Universe 2015 in Las Vegas, Nevada and won.
 Both Hannah Ruth Sison and Parul Shah also competed at Binibining Pilipinas 2014. Sison finished as Second Runner-Up, and competed again in 2015 where she finished as First Runner-Up. Shah on the other had, was crowned Binibining Pilipinas Tourism 2014, and was appointed by Binibining Pilipinas to represent the Philippines at Miss Grand International 2015 in Bangkok, Thailand where she finished as Third Runner-Up.
 Angeli Dione Gomez later competed at Mutya ng Pilipinas 2013 and was crowned Mutya ng Pilipinas Tourism International 2013. She competed at Miss Tourism International 2013-2014 in Putrajaya, Malaysia where she later emerged as the winner. Gomez's win is a back-to-back win after Rizzini Alexis Gomez's win in 2012.
 Imelda Schweighart later competed at Miss Philippines Earth 2016 where she later emerged as the winner. She competed in Miss Earth 2016 but was unplaced. Schweighart later resigned due to controversies prior to, and after Miss Earth 2016.
 Both and Charmaine Elima and Mariel de Leon later competed at Binibining Pilipinas 2017. Elima finished as First Runner-Up, while de Leon emerged as Binibining Pilipinas International 2017. De Leon competed at Miss International 2017 in Tokyo, Japan where she was unplaced.

References

2013
2013 in the Philippines
2013 beauty pageants